Lancisi is an Italian surname. It may refer to:

 Giovanni Maria Lancisi, an Italian physician
 Tommaso Lancisi, an Italian painter